Rollercoaster is a soundtrack album to the motion picture of the same name by Argentine composer, pianist and conductor Lalo Schifrin recorded in 1977 and released on the MCA label.

Reception
The Allmusic review states "Since much of Rollercoaster took place at amusement parks, the soundtrack required a complex mix of conventional thriller music and believable source music for the parks' attractions. Thankfully, composer Lalo Schifrin served up a score that managed to deliver on both counts... Fans of Schifrin's funkier work à la Enter the Dragon will also be pleased with the title cut, a barnstorming funk instrumental that layers wild flute and guitar solos over a rumbling bassline. All in all, Rollercoaster lacks the cohesiveness of the best soundtrack albums, but it is a solid showcase for Lalo Schifrin's multifaceted musical skills and is guaranteed to please his fans".

Track listing
All compositions by Lalo Schifrin
 "Prologue, Montage" - 5:28   
 "Magic Carousel" - 2:44   
 "Portrait of Harry" - 2:36   
 "Movement from String Quartette (Young Man's Theme)" - 2:33   
 "Penny Arcade" - 2:25   
 "Cotton Candy" - 2:34   
 "One Track Mind" - 2:17   
 "Merry-Go-Round" - 2:36   
 "Calliope of Death" - 2:06   
 "Rollercoaster" - 4:00   
 "Children's Ride" - 1:52   
 "Another Side of Harry" - 2:25   
 "Apple Turnover" - 3:53   
 "Magic Carousel - End Title" - 1:46

Personnel
Lalo Schifrin - arranger, conductor
Clark Spangler, Ralph Grierson, Bill Mays - keyboards
Dennis Budimer, Lee Ritenour - guitar
Anthony Jackson - bass
James Gadson - drums
Unnamed Orchestra
Sandy DeCrescent - orchestra manager

References

1977 soundtrack albums
MCA Records soundtracks
Lalo Schifrin soundtracks
Film scores
Albums conducted by Lalo Schifrin
Albums arranged by Lalo Schifrin